Chuck Weber (born April 25, 1958) is an American former professional stock car racing driver. He has previously competed in the ARCA Re/Max Series for 9 years and earned 4 top-10 finishes, including a pole at Michigan Speedway in his final season in 2006.

Racing career
Weber made his ARCA Bondo/Mar-Hyde Series debut in 1997, driving his self owned No. 24 Chevrolet at Gateway International Raceway, finishing 21st. He would make two more starts that year with a best finish of 17th at Atlanta Motor Speedway.

In 1998, Weber would run 19 of the 22 races on the schedule, and achieved a best result of 11th at Winchester Speedway, and finished 12th overall in the series standings. In 1999, he would enter in all but one race that year, failing to qualify in four events, and had a best result of 12th at Flat Rock Speedway on his way to 14th in the standings.

Weber would run the full schedule in 2000, failing to qualify at both Lowe's Motor Speedway events, but matched his best standings result of 12th. In 2001, he would run the full schedule, this time running in all events that year with a best result of 12th at Charlotte and the DuQuoin State Fairgrounds Racetrack, on his way to seventh in the standings, his best points result. He would drop to 14th in the standing the following year in 2002, and would drop further to 15th in 2003, which turned out to be his final full time season in ARCA competition.

In 2004, Weber would run only four races and earned a season best result of 12th at Talladega Superspeedway in a collaboration with Andy Belmont Racing.

After not running in the series in 2005, Weber would return in 2006, an what would be his best year in terms of results. After finishing outside the top-20 in three of the first four races before achieving his first top-10 at Kentucky Speedway with a sixth-place finish. He would achieve another top-10 finish of ninth at Pocono Raceway. At the next race at Michigan International Speedway a week later, Weber would start the weekend placing fifth in the practice session on Thursday. He would go on the qualify his No. 24 Ford on pole position with a time of 39.185 seconds and a speed of 183.744 mph. This would be his only pole in ARCA competition. During the race, he would go on to finish 24th, four laps down to race winner David Stremme. In the next two races, he would score two stright top-10's, including a fourth place at Kentucky Speedway. In his last race of the year, coincidentally at the track where he made his debut on, at Gateway, he would finish 35th due to an engine failure. This would be his last start in ARCA competition.

Personal life
Weber is the current owner of Cardinal Tool Company, a custom manufacturing company based in Forney, Texas that served as his sponsor during his racing career.

Motorsports results

ARCA Re/Max Series
(key) (Bold – Pole position awarded by qualifying time. Italics – Pole position earned by points standings or practice time. * – Most laps led. ** – All laps led.)

References

1958 births
Living people
NASCAR drivers
ARCA Menards Series drivers
Racing drivers from Dallas
Racing drivers from Texas
People from Mesquite, Texas